The Women's College can refer to:
The Women's College, University of Sydney
The Women's College, University of Queensland
The Women's College, University of Denver